The 1981 Volvo Grand Prix was the only men's professional tennis circuit held that year. It consisted of the four Grand Slam tournaments and the Grand Prix tournaments. The World Championship Tennis (WCT) Tour was incorporated into the Grand Prix circuit. The WCT tour consisted of eight regular tournaments, a season's final, three tournaments categorized as special events and a doubles championship. In total 89 tournaments were held divided over 29 countries. The circuit was administered by the Men's International Professional Tennis Council (MIPTC).

Schedule 
The table below shows the 1981 Volvo Grand Prix schedule (precursor to the ATP Tour).

January

February

March

April

May

June

July

August

September

October

November

December

January 1982

Points system 
The tournaments listed above were divided into twelve point categories. The highest points were allocated to the Grand Slam tournaments; French Open, the Wimbledon Championships, the US Open and the Australian Open. Points were allocated based on these categories and the finishing position of a player in a tournament. The points table is based on a 32 player draw. No points were awarded to first-round losers and advancements by default were equal to winning a round. The points allocation, with doubles points listed in brackets, is as follows:

Grand Prix standings 

1. Ivan Lendl (Cze)

2. John McEnroe (USA)

3. Jimmy Connors (USA)

4. José Luis Clerc (Arg)

5. Guillermo Vilas (Arg)

6. Björn Borg (Sue)

7. Roscoe Tanner (USA)

8. Eliot Teltscher (USA)

9. Vitas Gerulaitis (USA)

10. Yannick Noah (Fra)

ATP rankings 

*The official ATP year-end rankings were listed from January 4th, 1982.

WCT Tour standings

List of tournament winners 
The list of winners and number of singles titles won, alphabetically by last name:
  Björn Borg (3) French Open, Stuttgart Outdoor, Geneva
  José Luis Clerc (6) Florence, Rome, Boston, Washington, D.C., North Conway, Indianapolis
  Jimmy Connors (4) La Quinta, Brussels, Rotterdam, Wembley
  Kevin Curren (1) Johannesburg
  Eddie Dibbs (2) Forest Hills WCT, Quito
  Mark Edmondson (3) Adelaide, Bristol, Brisbane
  Wojciech Fibak (1) Gstaad
  Jaime Fillol (1) Mexico City
  John Fitzgerald (1) Kitzbühel
  Vitas Gerulaitis (1) Johannesburg
  Sammy Giammalva (1) Napa
  Hans Gildemeister (1) Santiago
  Shlomo Glickstein (1) South Orange
  Andrés Gómez (1) Bordeaux
  Brian Gottfried (1) Stowe
  Johan Kriek (3) Monterrey WCT, Newport, Australian Open
  Ramesh Krishnan (1) Manila
  Ivan Lendl (8) Stuttgart Indoor, Las Vegas, Montreal, Barcelona, Basel, Vienna, Cologne, Buenos Aires
  Chris Lewis (1) Munich
  Mario Martínez (1) Venice
  Gene Mayer (4) Memphis, Denver, Cleveland, Stockholm
  Sandy Mayer (1) Bologna
  John McEnroe (10) Boca Raton, Milan, Frankfurt, Los Angeles, Dallas WCT, Queen's Club, Wimbledon, Cincinnati, US Open, Sydney Indoor
  Peter McNamara (2) Hamburg, Melbourne Indoor
  Richard Meyer (1) Sofia
  Yannick Noah (2) Richmond WCT, Nice
  Gianni Ocleppo (1) Linz
  Manuel Orantes (1) Palermo
  Marko Ostoja (1) Brussels
  Víctor Pecci (2) Viña del Mar, Bournemouth
  Mel Purcell (3) Tampa, Atlanta, Tel Aviv
  Bill Scanlon (2) Auckland, Bangkok
  Pavel Složil (1) Nancy
  Roscoe Tanner (1) Philadelphia
  Balázs Taróczy (3) Monte Carlo, Hilversum, Tokyo Outdoor
  Brian Teacher (1) Columbus
  Eliot Teltscher (2) Puerto Rico, San Francisco
  Thierry Tulasne (1) Båstad
  Vince Van Patten (1) Tokyo Indoor
  Robert Van't Hof (1) Taiwan
  Guillermo Vilas (3) Mar del Plata, Cairo, Houston
  Mark Vines (1) Bercy
  Tim Wilkison (1) Sydney Outdoor
  Van Winitsky (1) Hong Kong

The following players won their first title in 1981:
  Kevin Curren Johannesburg
  John Fitzgerald Kitzbühel
  Sammy Giammalva Napa
  Andrés Gómez Bordeaux
  Ramesh Krishnan Manila
  Mel Purcell Tampa
  Pavel Složil Nancy
  Thierry Tulasne Båstad

See also 
 World Championship Tennis
 1981 WTA Tour

Notes

References

External links 
 ATP Archive 1981 Volvo Grand Prix Tournaments

Further reading 
 

 
Grand Prix tennis circuit seasons
Grand Prix